The Judicial Commission of Pakistan (informally JCP) is a commission for the appointment of Supreme Court and High Court Judges in Pakistan. The Chief Justice of Pakistan is the Chairman of JCP.

On 20 April 2010, 18th Constitutional Amendment was passed in the Parliament of Pakistan, which was later amended by 19th Constitutional Amendment.
In pursuance of the Amendments, a Judicial Commission was proposed to be created to recommend the appointment of Judges of the Superior Courts in Pakistan. Following is the collective text of the Article 175 (A) which was inserted in the constitution of Pakistan through this amendment.

Article 175 A. Appointment of Judges to the Supreme Court, High Courts and the Federal Shariat Court:
(1) There shall be a Judicial Commission of Pakistan, hereinafter in this Article referred to as the Commission, for appointment of Judges of the Supreme Court, High Courts and the Federal Shariat Court, as hereinafter provided.

(2) For appointment of Judges of the Supreme Court, the Commission shall consist of--- (i) Chief Justice of Pakistan - Chairman; (ii) four most senior Judges of the Supreme Court as Members; (iii) a former Chief Justice or a former Judge of the Supreme Court of Pakistan to be nominated by the Chief Justice of Pakistan, in consultation with the [four] member Judges, for a term of two years - Member; (iv) Federal Minister for Law and Justice as Member; (v) Attorney-General for Pakistan as Member; (vi) a Senior Advocate of the Supreme Court of Pakistan nominated by the Pakistan Bar Council for a term of two years as Member.

(3) Notwithstanding anything contained in clause (1) or clause (2), the President shall appoint the most senior Judge of the Supreme Court as the Chief Justice of Pakistan.

(4) The Commission may make rules regulating its procedure.......(5 to 7)

(8) The Commission by majority of its total membership shall nominate to the Parliamentary Committee one person, for each vacancy of a Judge in the Supreme Court, a High Court or the Federal Shariat Court, as the case may be.

(9) The Parliamentary Committee, hereinafter in this Article referred to as the Committee, shall consist of the following eight members, namely: (i) four members from the Senate; and (ii) four members from the National Assembly.
Provided that when the National Assembly is dissolved, the total member-ship of the parliamentary Committee shall consist of the members from the Senate only mentioned in paragraph (i) and the provisions of this Article shall, mutatis mutandis, apply.

(10) Out of the eight members of the Committee, four shall be from the Treasury Benches, two from each House and four from the Opposition Benches, two from each House. The nomination of members from the Treasury Benches shall be made by the Leader of the House and from the Opposition Benches by the Leader of the Opposition.

(11) Secretary, Senate shall act as the Secretary of the Committee.

(12) The Committee on receipt of a nomination from the Commission may confirm the nominee by majority of its total membership within fourteen days, failing which the nomination shall be deemed to have been con-firmed: 
Provided that the Committee for reasons to be recorded, may not confirm the nomination by three-fourths majority of its total membership within the said period.
Provided further that if a nomination is not confirmed by the Committee it shall forward its decision with reasons so recorded to the Commission through the Prime Minister.
Provided further that if a nomination is not confirmed, the Com-mission shall send another nomination.

(13) The Committee shall send the name of the nominee confirmed by it or deemed to have been confirmed to the Prime Minister who shall for-ward the same to the President for appointment.

(14) No action or decision taken by the Commission or a Committee shall be invalid or called in question only on the ground of the existence of a vacancy therein or of the absence of any member from any meeting thereof.

(15) The meetings of the Committee shall be held in camera and the record of its proceedings shall be maintained.

(16) The provisions of Article 68 shall not apply to the proceedings of the Committee.

(17) The Committee may make rules for regulating its procedure.

Through 18th Amendment in 2010, Pakistan got two forums for appointment of judges to the superior judiciary: a Judicial Commission with representation from the judiciary, lawyers and the federal government, responsible for recommending names of perspective judges; and a parliamentary committee [PC] to approve or reject these names but with assigning reasons if some name is rejected.

This mechanism had in fact curtailed the powers of the President and the political executive, which was also objectionable in deed, but the propaganda in the media was made that "CJP's powers have been cur-tailed" in the name of 'meaningful consultation' [the phrase devised and more emphasized by the CJP Sajjad Ali Shah, in fact]

The 18th amendment also provided (vide Para 3 of Article 175A) that the president shall appoint the senior most judge of the Supreme Court to the office of the CJP thus formally recognising the principle of seniority and legitimate expectancy enunciated by the apex court in the Al-Jihad case and subsequently reiterated in some other cases.

See also 
 Eighteenth Amendment to the Constitution of Pakistan
 Nineteenth Amendment to the Constitution of Pakistan
 High courts of Pakistan
 Supreme Judicial Council of Pakistan

References

Law of Pakistan
Supreme Court of Pakistan